The Guam Power Authority (GPA) is an agency of the Government of Guam and Guam's electricity provider. Its headquarters are in Fadian, Mangilao, Guam.

References

External links

 Guam Power Authority

Government of Guam